Low key is a term used in describing paintings or photographs that mainly consist of dark tones.

Low key may also refer to:

Science and technology
Low-key lighting, a style of lighting for photography, film or television
Low-key feedback, a type of output in human-computer interaction that takes a background role

People
Lowkey (born Kareem Dennis in 1986), an Iraqi-English rapper

Arts
Lo-Key?, a 1990s American hip hop/R&B band
Low Key, an album by Regine Velasquez-Alcasid
Low Key Arts, art space and music venue in Hot Springs, Arkansas, United States
"Low Key", a 2017 song by Russell Dickerson from the album Yours
"Low Key" (Ally Brooke song), 2019

See also
Low Ki, American professional wrestler
Loki (disambiguation)